The ecdysone receptor is a nuclear receptor found in arthropods, where it controls development and contributes to other processes such as reproduction. The receptor is a non-covalent heterodimer of two proteins, the EcR protein and ultraspiracle protein (USP). It binds to and is activated by ecdysteroids. Insect ecdysone receptors are currently better characterized than those from other arthropods, and mimics of  ecdysteroids are used commercially as caterpillar-selective insecticides.

Function 

Pulses of 20-hydroxyecdysone occur during insect development, whereupon this hormone binds to the ecdysone receptor, a ligand-activated transcription factor found in the nuclei of insect cells. This in turn leads to the activation of many other genes, as evidenced by puffing of polytene chromosomes at over a hundred sites. Ultimately the activation cascade causes physiological changes that result in ecdysis (moulting). The temporal expression of ecdysone receptor within neural stem cells mediates temporal patterning and neural diversity.

Structure  

The receptor is a non-covalent heterodimer of two proteins, the EcR protein and ultraspiracle protein (USP). These nuclear hormone receptor proteins are the insect orthologs of the mammalian farnesoid X receptor (FXR) and retinoid X receptor (RXR) proteins, respectively. Based on sequence homology considerations, some researchers reserve the term USP for the EcR partner from lepidopteran and dipteran insects, and use RXR in all other instances.

EcR and USP share the multi-domain architecture common to all nuclear hormone receptors, namely an N-terminal transcriptional activation domain (A/B domain), a DNA-binding domain (C domain, highly conserved between receptors), a linker region (D region), a ligand-binding domain (E domain, moderately conserved), and in some cases a distinct C-terminal extension (F-domain). The DNA-binding domains of EcR and USP recognise specific short sequences in DNA, and mediate the binding of the heterodimer to these ecdysone response elements (ECREs) in the promoters of ecdysone-responsive genes.

The ecdysteroid-binding pocket is located in the ligand binding domain of the EcR subunit, but EcR must be dimerised with a USP (or with an RXR) for high-affinity ligand binding to occur. In such circumstances, the binding of an agonist ligand triggers a conformational change in the C-terminal part of the EcR ligand-binding domain that leads to transcriptional activation of genes under ECRE control. There is also a ligand-binding pocket in the corresponding domain of USP. Its natural ligand remains uncertain, and USPs appear to be locked permanently in an inactive conformation.

X-ray crystal structures have been determined for several heterodimeric DNA-binding domains and ligand-binding domains from ecdysone receptors.

Commercial applications 

Ecdysone receptors have two main fields of application:

Gene switches - ecdysone receptor-controlled transgenes for controlled gene expression in scientific research, agriculture, and medicine. The last category includes potential use in gene therapy.
Insecticides - the development of selective insect growth regulators for use as environmentally benign insecticides. Although dibenzoylhydrazine compounds are not ecdysteroids, many are agonists of lepidopteran ecdysone receptors and are used as caterpillar-selective larvicides.

References

External links 

PDB representative structures of ecdysone receptor ligand binding domains:
 1R1K, ligand-binding domain heterodimer of Heliothis viresecens in complex with an ecdysteroid; 1R20, the same heterodimer in complex with a dibenzoylhydrazine agonist.
 Mimic insecticide, and associated regulatory information (for Australia).

Insect developmental biology
1